Poetic contractions are contractions of words found in poetry but not commonly used in everyday modern English. Also known as elision or syncope, these contractions are usually used to lower the number of syllables in a particular word in order to adhere to the meter of a composition. In languages like French, elision removes the end syllable of a word that ends with a vowel sound when the next begins with a vowel sound, in order to avoid hiatus, or retain a consonant-vowel-consonant-vowel rhythm.

Many of these poetic contractions originate from archaic English. By the end of the 18th century, contractions were generally looked down upon in standardized formal writing. This development may have been influenced by the publication of Samuel Johnson's A Dictionary of the English Language (1755).

List of common poetic contractions

References

Writing
English language